Wilferd Pearl Osborn (November 28, 1883 – September 2, 1954) was an outfielder in Major League Baseball. He played for the Philadelphia Phillies.

References

External links

1883 births
1954 deaths
Major League Baseball outfielders
Philadelphia Phillies players
Baseball players from Ohio
Fort Wayne Railroaders players
Canton Red Stockings players
Canton Chinamen players
Rochester Bronchos players
Louisville Colonels (minor league) players
People from Wyandot County, Ohio